Helvering v. Bruun, 309 U.S. 461 (1940), was an income tax case before the Supreme Court of the United States. It is notable (and thus appears frequently in law school casebooks) for holding that under section 22(a) of the Revenue Act of 1932, a landlord realizes a taxable gain when he repossesses property, the value of which has increased because the property was improved by a tenant.

Facts
A landlord repossessed land from a tenant who had defaulted in the eighteenth year of a 99-year lease. During the course of the lease, the tenant had torn down an old building (in which the landlord's adjusted basis was now $12,811.43) and had built a new one (whose value was now $64,245.68). The lease had specified that the landlord was not required to compensate the tenant for these improvements.

The government argued that upon repossession, the landlord realized a gain of $51,434.25. The landlord argued that there was no realization of the property because no transaction had occurred, and because the improvement of the property that created the gain was not "severable" from the landlord's original capital.

Holding
The court held for the government: under the Revenue Act of 1932, the value of the improvements was realized by the taxpayer as income in the year in which the forfeiture occurred.

The improvements, the Court observed, were received by the taxpayer "as a result of a business transaction," namely, the leasing of the taxpayer's land. It was not necessary to the recognition of gain that the improvements be severable from the land. All that had to be shown was that the taxpayer had acquired valuable assets from his lease in exchange for the use of his property. The medium of exchange—whether cash or in kind, and whether separately disposable or "affixed"—was immaterial as far as the realization criterion was concerned. In effect, the improvements represented rent, or rather a payment in lieu of rent, which was taxable to the landlord regardless of the form in which it was received.

"Severance" is not necessary for realization:

It is not necessary to recognition of taxable gain that he should be able to sever the improvement begetting the gain from his original capital. If that were necessary, no income could arise from the exchange of property, whereas such gain has always been recognized as realized taxable gain.

The Court added that, while not all economic gain is "realized" for taxation purposes, realization does not require that the economic gain be in "cash derived from the sale of an asset". Realization can also arise from property exchange; relief of indebtedness; or other transactions yielding profit—e.g. by receiving an asset with enhanced value in a transaction, even where severance does not occur (i.e. even where "the gain is a portion of the value of property received by the taxpayer in the transaction").

Subsequent legislation

Congress nullified the effect of section 22 of the Revenue Act of 1932 (as interpreted by the Court in Bruun) by enacting the Revenue Act of 1942, section 115 of which included an amendment of section 22 of the Internal Revenue Code of 1939. The effect of that amendment to the 1939 Code was carried forward in sections 109 and 1019 of the Internal Revenue Code of 1954 (now the Internal Revenue Code of 1986). Section 109 excludes, from a lessor's income, the value of leasehold improvements realized on termination of a lease. Section 1019 denies the lessor a step-up in basis for the income so excluded. These provisions overrule the proposition announced in Bruun, that repossession of an asset with an enhanced value from a transaction with another party results in recognition of gross income.

The aim of the Revenue Act of 1942 was to relieve lessors—suddenly confronted with large tax obligations—of the need to raise cash in a hurry, at a time when the real estate market was scraping bottom. An inadvertent side effect of the means chosen—permitting current income to be deferred to later period—was to reduce the lessor's tax obligation absolutely, by postponing his realization of any improvements to the sale of the property.

Academic commentary

See also
 List of United States Supreme Court cases, volume 309
 Cottage Savings Ass'n v. Commissioner

References

Further reading

External links

1940 in United States case law
United States Supreme Court cases
United States Supreme Court cases of the Hughes Court
United States taxation and revenue case law